Coleophora asiaeminoris is a moth of the family Coleophoridae that is endemic to Turkey.

References

External links

asiaeminoris
Moths of Asia
Endemic fauna of Turkey
Moths described in 1952